"The Greasy Chip Butty Song" is a football chant sung by the supporters of Sheffield United football club to the tune of "Annie's Song", glorifying life in Sheffield, in chief the eponymous chip butty but also nightlife, beer and tobacco products. The song, with its good-natured humour, has been adopted and adapted by fans of a number of other association football teams.

Origin
The song was initially written in the late 1970’s by a Rotherham United fan named Terry Moran. While the song became known as the "Greasy Chip Butty Song", Moran's inspiration came from Magnet, with the mention of chip butties being an afterthought. Gavin Hancock, a Rotherham Blade, overheard Moran singing the song in a pub and wrote his own version about the Blades; Hancock's version quickly grew in popularity among Sheffield United supporters from the early 1980’s and is now considered the club's anthem.

Words and music
The song is to the tune of "Annie's Song" by John Denver to lyrics that have varied over time with changes to the opening and final two lines.

In 2010, the Sheffield Star printed a version of the lyrics with "You fill up my senses... come thrill me again". In 2020, local musician Max Restaino recorded a version of the song in aid of the Sheffield Hospitals Charity. This recording also used "You fill up my senses... come thrill me again" lyrics.

Meaning
To a native of Yorkshire the words are probably self-explanatory; the words celebrate the many pleasures that can be had in Sheffield, culminating in the target of the fan's adoration, in this instance, Sheffield United.
Magnet refers to Magnet Bitter from John Smith's Brewery, widely available in Yorkshire.
 Woodbines refers nostalgically to a once-popular brand of strong cigarette.
Snuff is ground tobacco for sniffing up the nose. Wilson's Snuff Mill, established in 1737, is located a mile away from Bramall Lane.
 A greasy chip butty can be purchased in any of the many local fish and chip shops. Butty is a dialect word for a sandwich, and a chip butty is simply a sandwich where the filling is chips, ideally greasy and sometimes sprinkled with salt and vinegar. Generally, a white sandwich bap will be used for the bread. In Sheffield, these are simply known as breadcakes.

The song itself is a plaintive rally-cry by the fans of Sheffield United.  It is usually heard at the start of home games played at 'Beautiful Downtown Bramall Lane' (as it is often called by the announcer on match days), the home of the club, and sporadically throughout away matches.

Other versions
Moran's original version is similar save for the mentions of Sheffield (replaced respectively with "Masborough" and "Rotherham United") and the last line, which Moran changed to "Can’t fill me enough".

Modified versions of the song are also sung by supporters of Burton Albion (where the references to Magnet and Woodbines are replaced with Marston's Pedigree ("Peddi") and Walkers), Grimsby Town (where Magnet is replaced by Tetley's) and St Helens R.F.C. (where the beer is Greenalls and a kebab replaces cigarettes).

Greenall's is the local beer, Geno's a popular kebab shop in town and Martine's was a nightclub which has since closed. A "Split" is a local slang name for chips and peas ordered from a chippy in St Helens, as in the songs case it is also served with fish and curry. The reference to glue-sniffing is black humour based on the reputation the town gained as industry was closed down under the Thatcher government leaving less opportunities for young people and leading to St Helens being viewed as a dying town. This experience was not unique in the industrial north at the time and the reference in the song should be taken as an example of the sharp wit of Sintelliners rather than a reflection of the town itself.

International version
In January 2007, in tribute to Sheffield United's visiting Chinese sister team, the Chengdu Blades, the Sheffield Star penned the following version – the Greasy Egg Noodle song.

References

External links
 You Fill Up My Senses...by Blades4PremTake2 (U8741018) 20 December 2007
 YouTube: The Greasy Chip Butty Song

Football songs and chants
Sheffield United F.C.
Rotherham United F.C.
Grimsby Town F.C.
Burton Albion F.C.